
Year 1534 (MDXXXIV) was a common year starting on Thursday (link will display the full calendar) of the Julian calendar.

Events 

 January–June 
 January 15 – The Parliament of England passes the Act Respecting the Oath to the Succession, recognising the marriage of Henry VIII and Anne Boleyn, and their children as the legitimate heirs to the throne.
 February 23 – A group of Anabaptists, led by Jan Matthys, seize Münster, Westphalia and declare it The New Jerusalem, begin to exile dissenters, and forcibly baptize all others.
 c. March – The Portuguese crown divides Colonial Brazil into fifteen donatory captaincies.
 April 5 (Easter Sunday) – Anabaptist Jan Matthys is killed by the Landsknechte, who laid siege to Münster on the day he predicted as the Second Coming of Christ. His follower John of Leiden takes control of the city.
 April 7 – Sir Thomas More is confined in the Tower of London.
 May 10 – Jacques Cartier explores Newfoundland, while searching for the Northwest Passage.
 June 9 – Jacques Cartier is the first European to discover the Gulf of St Lawrence.
 June 23 – Copenhagen opens its gates to Count Christopher of Oldenburg, leading the army of Lübeck (and the Hanseatic League), nominally in the interests of the deposed King Christian II of Denmark. The surrenders of Copenhagen and, a few days later, of Malmö represent the high point of the Count's War for the forces of the League. These victories presumably lead the Danish nobility to recognize Christian III as King on July 4.
 June 29 – Jacques Cartier discovers Prince Edward Island.

 July–December 
 July 4 – The Election of Christian III, as King of Denmark, takes place in the town of Rye.
 July 7 – The first known exchange occurs between Europeans and natives of the Gulf of St. Lawrence, in New Brunswick.
 August 15 – Ignatius of Loyola and six others take the vows that lead to the establishment of the Society of Jesus, in Montmartre (Paris).
 August 26 – Piero de Ponte becomes the 45th Grandmaster of the Knights Hospitaller.
 October 13 – Pope Paul III succeeds Pope Clement VII, as the 220th pope.
 October 18 – Huguenots post placards all over France attacking the Catholic Mass, provoking a violent sectarian reaction.
 November 3–December 18 – The English Reformation Parliament passes the Act of Supremacy, establishing Henry VIII as supreme head of the Church of England.
 December 6 – Over 200 Spanish settlers, led by conquistador Sebastián de Belalcázar, found what becomes Quito, Ecuador.

 Date unknown 
 Act for the Submission of the Clergy is confirmed by the Parliament of England, requiring churchmen to submit to the king, and forbidding the publication of ecclesiastical laws without royal permission.
 Manco Inca Yupanqui is crowned as Sapa Inca in Cusco, Peru by Spanish conquistador Francisco Pizarro, in succession to his brother Túpac Huallpa (d. October 1533).
 The Ottoman army under Suleiman the Magnificent captures the city of Baghdad from the Safavids.
 Cambridge University Press is given a Royal Charter by Henry VIII of England, and becomes the first of the privileged presses.
 Gargantua is published by François Rabelais.
 Martin Luther's translation of the complete Christian Bible into German is printed by Hans Lufft in Wittenberg, adding the Old Testament and Apocrypha to Luther's 1522 translation of the New Testament, and including woodcut illustrations.
 The first book in Yiddish is printed (in Kraków), Mirkevet ha-Mishneh, a Tanakh concordance by Rabbi Asher Anchel, translating difficult phrases in biblical Hebrew.

Births 

 January 6 – Pavao Skalić, Croatian encyclopedist, Renaissance humanist and adventurer (d. 1575)
 February 5 – Giovanni de' Bardi, Italian writer, composer and soldier (d. 1612)
 February 10 – Song Ikpil, Korean scholar (d. 1599)
 March 19 – José de Anchieta, Spanish Jesuit missionary in Brazil (d. 1597)
 April 18 – William Harrison, English clergyman (d. 1593)
 June 15 – Henri I de Montmorency, Marshal of France (d. 1614)
 June 23 – Oda Nobunaga, Japanese warlord (d. 1582)
 July 1 – King Frederick II of Denmark (d. 1588)
 July 3 – Myeongjong of Joseon, ruler of Korea (d. 1567)
 July 18 – Zacharius Ursinus, German theologian (d. 1583)
 August 29 – Nicholas Pieck, Dutch Franciscan friar and martyr (d. 1572)
 September 24 – Guru Ram Das, fourth Sikh Guru (d. 1581)
 October 4 – William I, Count of Schwarzburg-Frankenhausen (d. 1597)
 October 18 – Jean Passerat, French writer (d. 1602)
 November 2 – Archduchess Eleanor of Austria (d. 1594)
 November 6 – Joachim Camerarius the Younger, German scientist (d. 1598)
 November 17 – Karl I, Prince of Anhalt-Zerbst, German prince (d. 1561)
 November 26 – Henry Berkeley, 7th Baron Berkeley (d. 1613)
 December 16 – Lucas Osiander the Elder, German pastor (d. 1604)
 December 16 – Hans Bol, Flemish artist (d. 1593)
 date unknown
 Lodovico Agostini, Italian composer (d. 1590)
 Isaac Luria, Jewish scholar and mystic (d. 1572)
 Henry Herbert, 2nd Earl of Pembroke, statesman of the Elizabethan era (d. 1601)
 Paul Skalić, Croatian encyclopedist, humanist and adventurer (d. 1573)
 Joan Waste, English Protestant martyr (d. 1556)
 Lautaro, Mapuche warrior (d. 1557)

Deaths 

 January 9 – Johannes Aventinus, Bavarian historian and philologist (b. 1477)
 January 25 – Magdalena of Saxony (b. 1507)
 February 15 – Barbara Jagiellon, duchess consort of Saxony and Margravine consort of Meissen (1500–1534) (b. 1478)
 March 5 – Antonio da Correggio, Italian painter (b. 1489)
 March 17 – Vojtěch I of Pernstein, Bohemian nobleman (b. 1490)
 March 19 – Michael Weiße, German theologian (b. c. 1488)
 April 5 – Jan Matthys, German Anabaptist reformer
 April 20 – Elizabeth Barton, English prophet and nun (executed) (b. 1506)
 May 3 – Juana de la Cruz Vázquez Gutiérrez, Spanish abbess of the Franciscan Third Order Regular (b. 1481)
 June 14 – Chaitanya Mahaprabhu, Bengali mystic (b. 1486)
 June 27 – Hille Feicken, Dutch Anabaptist
 August 3 – Andrea della Valle, Italian Catholic cardinal (b. 1463)
 August 9 – Thomas Cajetan, Italian theologian and cardinal (b. 1470)
 August 21 – Philippe Villiers de L'Isle-Adam, 44th Grandmaster of the Knights Hospitaller (b. 1464)
 September 7 – Lazarus Spengler, German hymnwriter (b. 1479)
 September 24 – Michael Glinski, Lithuanian prince (b. c. 1470)
 September 25 – Pope Clement VII (b. 1478)
 October 31 – Alfonso I d'Este, Duke of Ferrara (b. 1476)
 November 7 – Ferdinand of Portugal, Duke of Guarda and Trancoso, Portuguese nobleman (b. 1507)
 November 8 – William Blount, 4th Baron Mountjoy, scholar and patron (b. c. 1478)
 November 23 – Beatriz Galindo, Spanish Latinist and scholar  (b. 1465)  
 December 9 – Balthasar of Hanau-Münzenberg, German nobleman (b. 1508)
 December 27 – Antonio da Sangallo the Elder, Florentine architect (b. 1453)
 date unknown
 István Báthory, Hungarian noble (b. 1477)
 Edward Guildford, Lord Warden of the Cinque Ports (b. 1474)
 Cesare Hercolani, Italian soldier, murdered (b. 1499)
 Humphrey Kynaston, English highwayman (b. 1474)
 Amago Okihisa, Japanese nobleman (b. 1497)
 John Taylor, English Master of the Rolls (b. 1480)

References